This list of fictional pachyderms is a subsidiary to the List of fictional ungulates. Characters from various fictional works are organized by medium.

Outside strict biological classification, the term "pachyderm" is commonly used to describe elephants, rhinoceroses, and hippopotamuses; this list also includes extinct mammals such as woolly mammoths, mastodons, etc.

Literature

Comics

Mythology

Media

Film

Television

Animation

Video games

Other
Nellie the Elephant, a song written in 1956, by Ralph Butler and Peter Hart about a fictional intelligent elephant of the same name.
B.B. Bubbles, a pink animatronic circus elephant who played the piano at Chuck E Cheese's Pizza Time Theatre.
Dolli Dimples, a female piano playing hippo at Chuck E. Cheese's Pizza Time Theatre.
Ellie Funt, a lavender elephant stuffed from Suzy's Zoo.
Welephant, a red elephant cartoon character with a fireman's helmet; icon for promoting fire safety to children, and mascot for the Children's Burn Trust.
Elmer the Safety Elephant, mascot and icon for Canada Safety Council.
Hippo, a peach-colored hippo cartoon character that wears blue-and-white-striped pyjamas, and mascot for Silentnight.

See also
Lists of fictional animals
List of individual elephants

Notes

References

Pachy

Pachy
Lists of elephants